The Men's and Women's Volleyball Tournament took place during the 1987 Pan American Games, which was held from August 7 to August 23, 1987, in Indianapolis, United States. Events were held at the Hinkle Fieldhouse.

Men's indoor tournament

Preliminary round robin

Final round

Final ranking

Individual Awards

Women's indoor tournament

Preliminary round robin

Final round

Final ranking

Individual Awards

References
 Men's results
 Women's results

Events at the 1987 Pan American Games
1987
Pan American Games
Volleyball in Indiana